Manylovo is a rural locality (a village) in Kupriyanovskoye Rural Settlement, Gorokhovetsky District, Vladimir Oblast, Russia. The population was 13 as of 2010.

Geography 
Manylovo is located on the Vazhnya River, 14 km southwest of Gorokhovets (the district's administrative centre) by road. Molodniki is the nearest rural locality.

References 

Rural localities in Gorokhovetsky District